Tessaracoccus bendigoensis is a Gram-positive bacterium from the genus Tessaracoccus which has been isolated from activated sludge in Bendigo, Australia.

References 

Propionibacteriales
Bacteria described in 1999